The Birnbaum–Saunders distribution, also known as the fatigue life distribution, is a probability distribution used extensively in reliability applications to model failure times. There are several alternative formulations of this  distribution in the literature.  It is named after Z. W. Birnbaum and S. C. Saunders.

Theory

This distribution was developed to model failures due to cracks. A material is placed under repeated cycles of stress. The jth cycle leads to an increase in the crack by Xj amount. The sum of the Xj is assumed to be normally distributed with mean nμ and variance nσ2. The probability that the crack does not exceed a critical length ω is

where Φ() is the cdf of normal distribution.

If T is the number of cycles to failure then the cumulative distribution function (cdf) of T is

The more usual form of this distribution is:

Here α is the shape parameter and β is the scale parameter.

Properties

The Birnbaum–Saunders distribution is unimodal with a median of β.

The mean (μ), variance (σ2), skewness (γ) and kurtosis (κ) are as follows:

Given a data set that is thought to be Birnbaum–Saunders distributed the parameters' values are best estimated by maximum likelihood.

If T is Birnbaum–Saunders distributed with parameters α and β then T−1 is also Birnbaum-Saunders distributed with parameters α and β−1.

Transformation

Let T be a Birnbaum-Saunders distributed variate with parameters α and β. A useful transformation of T is

.

Equivalently

.

X is then distributed normally with a mean of zero and a variance of α2 / 4.

Probability density function

The general formula for the probability density function (pdf) is

Standard fatigue life distribution

The case where μ = 0 and β = 1 is called the standard fatigue life distribution. The pdf for the standard fatigue life distribution reduces to

Since the general form of probability functions can be expressed in terms of the standard distribution, all of the subsequent formulas are given for the standard form of the function.

Cumulative distribution function

The formula for the cumulative distribution function is

where Φ is the cumulative distribution function of the standard normal distribution.

Quantile function

The formula for the quantile function is

where Φ −1 is the quantile function of the standard normal distribution.

References

External links
Fatigue life distribution

Continuous distributions